Krisztofer Durázi (born 13 October 1998) is a Hungarian professional basketball player, who currently plays for Egis Körmend. Durázi mainly plays as small forward.

Professional career
On 6 December 2017, Durázi recorded 21 points and 19 rebounds in his first European game, in a 104–43 win over  Karpoš Sokoli in the FIBA Europe Cup.

References

1998 births
Living people
Falco KC Szombathely players
Hungarian men's basketball players
Small forwards
Sportspeople from Szombathely